Skøytekongen (The Skating King) is a black-and-white Norwegian drama film from 1953 directed by Nils R. Müller. The script was written by Sigbjørn Hølmebakk based on a concept by Bjørn Storberget. The film stars Lasse Kolstad and Sidsel Meyer.

Plot
Skating king Hans Hellemo grew up under difficult conditions. His father's highest dream in life was for his son to go to college. Hans works as a truck driver, and the rest of the time he practices skating. His father watches with bitterness how his son's friends go off to college one by one, while his son is still working. Eventually it dawns on Hans that it is not enough to just be a skating king. He marries and has children. Hans wants to retire from the sport, but his fame prevents him: the people keep demanding that he show up. With the help of his wife, however, he takes the step and prepares for his last big race.

Cast

 Lasse Kolstad as Hans Hellemo 
 Sidsel Meyer as Kitten Slåttan 
 Espen Skjønberg as Høye, a journalist 
 Harald Heide Steen as Slåttan, a skating coach
 Eugen Skjønberg as Hellemo, a truck driver
 Lydia Opøien as Hellemo's wife
 Bjarne Andersen as a disabled sports fan
 Haakon Arnold
 Arne Bang-Hansen
 Bjarne Bø
 Joachim Calmeyer
 Edvard Drabløs
 Dan Fosse
 Bonne Gauguin
 Sverre Hansen
 Harald Heide-Steen Jr.
 Joachim Holst-Jensen
 Elsa Isefiær
 Torhild Lindal
 Alf Malland
 Maja Lise Rønneberg
 Pål Skjønberg
 Alfred Solaas
 Astrid Sommer
 Johan Sverre
 Axel Thue
 Einar Vaage
 Ottar Wicklund

References

External links
 
 Skøytekongen at the National Library of Norway
 Skøytekongen at Filmfront

1953 films
Norwegian black-and-white films
Norwegian drama films
Films directed by Nils R. Müller